Nicholas John Robertson (born November 1967) is a British businessman, the co-founder of ASOS.com, an online fashion and beauty retailer, and its CEO from 2000 to 2015.

Robertson, along with his brother Nigel Robertson the founder of FreePages, was educated at Canford School, Dorset.

In 2016, as part of the divorce settlement with his ex-wife Janice, Robertson was ordered by a high court judge to pay her £70 million, about a third of his £220m net worth.

In May 2020, football club AFC Wimbledon announced that he would become a minority shareholder.

In 2020, he became a major shareholder in Kidly.co.uk (a kids clothing and toys website) and TackleTarts.uk (an angling marketplace).

References

1967 births
Living people
People educated at Canford School
British retail company founders
English company founders